Svetlana Kuznetsova was the defending champion, but had to withdraw due to a back injury.

Lindsay Davenport won the title, defeating Francesca Schiavone 6–2, 6–4 in the final.

Seeds
The top two seeds received a bye into the second round.

Draw

Finals

Top half

Bottom half

References

External links
 ITF tournament edition details

2005 WTA Tour
Commonwealth Bank Tennis Classic
Sport in Indonesia